The 1975 NBA draft was the 29th annual draft of the National Basketball Association (NBA). The draft was held on May 29, 1975, before the 1975–76 season. In this draft, 18 NBA teams took turns selecting amateur U.S. college basketball players and other eligible players, including international players. The first two picks in the draft belonged to the teams that finished last in each conference, with the order determined by a coin flip. The Atlanta Hawks, who obtained the New Orleans Jazz first-round pick in a trade, won the coin flip and were awarded the first overall pick, while the Los Angeles Lakers were awarded the second pick. Prior to the draft, the Kansas City-Omaha Kings were renamed the Kansas City Kings. Before the draft, 18 college underclassmen and 2 high school players were declared eligible for selection under the "hardship" rule. These players had applied and gave evidence of financial hardship to the league, which granted them the right to start earning their living by starting their professional careers earlier.

This was the most recent NBA draft to be held in a month other than June until 2020, but the off-season was earlier at the time. The league also hosted a supplementary draft for American Basketball Association (ABA) players who never were never drafted by the NBA teams on December 30, 1975. A player who had finished his four-year college eligibility was eligible for selection. If a player left college early, he would not be eligible for selection until his college class graduated.

Draft selections and draftee career notes
David Thompson from North Carolina State University was selected first overall by the Atlanta Hawks. He was also drafted first overall in the 1975 ABA Draft by the Virginia Squires, before the Squires traded his draft rights to the Denver Nuggets. He opted to join the ABA with the Nuggets before moving to the NBA in 1976 after both leagues merged. During his first and only season in the ABA, he won the ABA All-Star Game MVP and ABA Rookie of the Year, as well as selected to the ABA All-Star Game and All-ABA Team. His NBA achievements include two All-NBA Team selections and four NBA All-Star Game selections. For his achievements, he has been inducted to the Basketball Hall of Fame. Marvin Webster, the 3rd pick, also opted to join the ABA with the Nuggets before moving to the NBA in 1976. Thompson and Webster were the only first-round picks from the draft who declined to play in the NBA and opted to play in the ABA. Coincidentally, Webster was also drafted by the Hawks, which means that both the Hawks' first-round picks did not play with them. Instead, both signed to play for the Nuggets in the ABA.

Gus Williams, the 20th pick, joined the Seattle SuperSonics after two seasons with the Golden State Warriors. He then won the NBA championship with the Sonics in 1979. He was also selected to two All-NBA Team and two All-Star Games. World B. Free (then known as Lloyd Free), the 23rd pick, played for five teams in his 13-year career and was selected to one All-NBA Team and one All-Star Game. Dan Roundfield, the 28th pick, was also drafted in the 1975 ABA Draft. He opted to join the ABA with the Indiana Pacers before moving to the NBA in 1976. His achievements include one All-NBA Team selection, three NBA All-Star Game selections, three NBA All-Star Game selections and four NBA All-Defensive Team selections. Alvan Adams from the University of Oklahoma, who went on to win the Rookie of the Year Award in his first season, was selected 4th by the Phoenix Suns. Adams and 6th pick Lionel Hollins are the only other players from this draft who was selected to an All-Star Game. After retiring as a player, Hollins went on to have a coaching career. He was twice named as the interim head coach for the Vancouver/Memphis Grizzlies in 1999 and 2004 before becoming a permanent head coach in 2009.

Darryl Dawkins, the 5th pick, and Bill Willoughby, the 19th pick, became the first two high school players to directly enter the NBA after their high school graduation. They also became the second and third players to go directly from high school basketball to professional league, after Moses Malone in the 1974 ABA Draft. They also became the second and third high school players ever drafted in the NBA, after Reggie Harding in the 1962 Draft. However, because the rules prevented Harding from playing in the league until one year after his high school class graduated, he had to wait a year before entering the league in 1963. Dawkins played 14 seasons in the NBA with four different NBA teams, while Willoughby played 8 seasons with six teams.

In the tenth round, the New Orleans Jazz selected a Soviet basketball player Alexander Belov with the 161st pick. Belov, who was playing with Spartak Leningrad before the draft, stayed with the club until the end of his career. He had a successful career, winning two European Cup Winners' Cup and one Soviet Union championship, as well as four gold medals with the Soviet Union national team. For his achievements, he has been inducted by the International Basketball Federation (FIBA) to the FIBA Hall of Fame.

Key

Draft

Other picks
The following list includes other draft picks who have appeared in at least one NBA game.

Notable undrafted players
These players were not selected in the 1975 draft but played at least one game in the NBA.

Trades
 On May 20, 1974, the Atlanta Hawks acquired Bob Kauffman, Dean Meminger, 1974 and 1975 first-round picks, 1975 and 1976 second-round picks, and a 1980 third-round pick from the New Orleans Jazz in exchange for Pete Maravich. The Hawks used the picks to draft David Thompson and Bill Willoughby.
 On October 8, 1974, the New Orleans Jazz acquired Russ Lee and a first-round pick from the Milwaukee Bucks in exchange for Steve Kuberski and a second-round pick. Previously, the Jazz acquired Neal Walk and the pick on September 16, 1974, from the Phoenix Suns in exchange for Dennis Awtrey, Nate Hawthorne, Curtis Perry and a 1976 first-round pick. The Jazz used the pick to draft Rich Kelley. The Bucks used the pick to draft Clyde Mayes.
 On May 17, 1974, the Los Angeles Lakers acquired a first-round pick from the Cleveland Cavaliers in exchange for Jim Chones. The Lakers used the pick to draft Junior Bridgeman.
 On May 28, 1975, the Kansas City Kings acquired the tenth pick from the New Orleans Jazz in exchange for Ron Behagen and a 1976 second-round pick. Previously the Jazz acquired Henry Bibby and a first-round pick on February 1, 1975, from the New York Knicks in exchange for Jim Barnett and Neal Walk. Previously the Knicks acquired the pick on December 26, 1974, from the Detroit Pistons in exchange for Howard Porter. The Kings used the pick to draft Bill Robinzine.
 On September 3, 1974, the Golden State Warriors acquired Clifford Ray and a first-round pick from the Chicago Bulls in exchange for Nate Thurmond. The Warriors used the pick to draft Joe Bryant.
 On the draft-day, the Cleveland Cavaliers acquired Butch Beard, a first-round pick and a second-round pick from the Golden State Warriors in exchange for Dwight Davis. The Cavaliers used the picks to draft John Lambert and Mel Utley.
 On the draft-day, the Phoenix Suns acquired a first-round pick from the Buffalo Braves in exchange for a 1976 first-round pick. The Suns used the pick to draft Ricky Sobers.
 On September 24, 1974, the Golden State Warriors acquired a second-round pick from the Los Angeles Lakers in exchange for Zelmo Beaty. The Warriors used the pick to draft Gus Williams.
 On January 7, 1974, the Chicago Bulls acquired a second-round pick from the Seattle SuperSonics in exchange for John Hummer. The Bulls used the pick to draft Steve Green.
 On May 28, 1974, the New York Knicks acquired Howard Porter and a second-round pick from the Chicago Bulls in exchange for a 1974 first-round pick. Previously the Bulls acquired John Hummer, the pick and a 1974 second-round pick on September 10, 1973, from the Buffalo Braves in exchange for Gar Heard and Kevin Kunnert. The Knicks used the pick to draft Larry Fogle.
 On September 6, 1974, the Phoenix Suns acquired Dave Stallworth and a second-round pick from the Washington Bullets in exchange for Clem Haskins. The Suns used the pick to draft Allen Murphy.
 On May 23, 1975, the Phoenix Suns acquired Paul Westphal, 1975 and 1976 second-round picks from the Boston Celtics in exchange for Charlie Scott. The Suns used the pick to draft Jimmy Dan Conner.
 On December 6, 1974, the New Orleans Jazz acquired a third-round pick from the Los Angeles Lakers in exchange for Stu Lantz. The Jazz used the pick to draft Jim McElroy.
 On August 20, 1974, the Washington Bullets acquired Dick Gibbs and a third-round pick from the Seattle SuperSonics in exchange for Archie Clark. The Bullets used the pick to draft Tom Kropp.
 On September 18, 1974, the Portland Trail Blazers acquired a third-round pick from the Chicago Bulls in exchange for Mickey Johnson. The Blazers used the pick to draft Gus Gerard.
 On October 9, 1973, the Phoenix Suns acquired 1974 and 1975 third-round picks from the Washington Bullets (as the Capital Bullets) in exchange for Walt Wesley. The Suns used the pick to draft Bayard Forrest.

Early entrants

College underclassmen
The following college basketball players successfully applied for an NBA hardship.

  Alvan Adams – C/F, Oklahoma (junior)
  Joe Bryant – F, La Salle (junior)
  Luther Burden – G, Utah (junior)
  Henry Fields – G, Ohio State (freshman)
  Larry Fogle – G, Canisius (junior)
  Bayard Forrest – C, Grand Canyon (junior)
  Lloyd Free – G, Guilford (junior)
  Robert Hawkins – G, Illinois State (junior)
  Walter Luckett – G, Ohio (junior)
  Cyrus Mann – C, Illinois State (freshman)
  Glen Matthews – F, Tunxis CC (junior)
  Frank Oleynick – G, Seattle (junior)
  Joe Pace – C, Coppin State (junior)
  Eugene Short – F, Jackson State (junior)
  Lawrence Smith – F, North Carolina A&T (junior)

High school players
The following high school basketball players successfully applied for an NBA hardship.

  Darryl Dawkins – C, Maynard Evans HS (Orlando, Florida)
  Bill Willoughby – F, Dwight Morrow HS (Englewood, New Jersey)

Supplementary draft

On December 9, 1975, the NBA planned to host a supplementary draft to settle negotiating rights to five ABA players who had never been eligible for the NBA draft because their college classes had not graduated and they had not apply for hardship. The teams selected in reverse order of their win–loss record in the previous season. The team that made a selection must withdraw their equivalent selection in the 1976 Draft. The teams were allowed to not exercise their rights on this hardship draft and thus retained their full selection in the 1976 Draft. The draft itself attracted strong opposition from the ABA who accuse the NBA trying to reduce confidence in the stability of their league. Despite the initial postponement of the draft, the draft was finally held on December 30, 1975.

The New Orleans Jazz used the first pick to select Moses Malone, a former high school player who went directly to professional basketball after he was drafted in the 1974 ABA Draft. The Los Angeles Lakers used the second pick to select Mark Olberding, a college freshman who was drafted in the 1974 ABA Draft. Because the Jazz and the Lakers had traded their first round picks in the 1976 Draft, they had to forfeit their first-round pick in the 1977 Draft. The other players selected were Mel Bennett, Skip Wise and Charles Jordan in the second, third and fourth-round respectively. All players, except Wise, were under contract with their ABA team at the time of the draft. They remained with their team until the end of the season. After the Virginia Squires folding before the ABA–NBA merger in June 1976, Bennett joined the team that drafted him, the Philadelphia 76ers. Under the merger agreement, the Jazz and the Lakers had to yield their rights to Malone and Olberding and they regained their 1977 first-round picks. Malone was later drafted by the Portland Trail Blazers in the ABA Dispersal Draft, while Olberding remained with the Spurs who joined the NBA. Two other draftees, Wise and Jordan never played in the NBA.

Notes

See also
 List of first overall NBA draft picks

References
General

Specific

External links
NBA.com
NBA.com: NBA Draft History

Draft
National Basketball Association draft
NBA draft
NBA draft
Basketball in New York City
Sporting events in New York City